The Rock Heroes are one of the artist collectives operating under the Big Eye Music banner specializing in modern and classic rock.  As of early 2004, they have released over 50 albums both compact disc and digitally.  The group achieved their biggest success when their version of Kid Rock’s “All Summer Long” debuted at No. 38 on the Billboard Hot 100 charts and then rose to No. 29 the next week.  In Canada, it debuted at No. 16 on the Canadian Hot 100.

Discography

Studio albums

Singles

References

External links
Official Website
Official Facebook
Google Plus

Electronic music groups from California
Musical groups from Los Angeles